Thomas Edward O'Meara  (1872–1902) was a catcher in Major League Baseball. He played for the Cleveland Spiders in 1895 and 1896.

External links

1872 births
1902 deaths
Major League Baseball catchers
Cleveland Spiders players
Baseball players from Illinois
19th-century baseball players
Ishpeming-Nagaunee Unions players
Springfield Ponies players
Springfield Maroons players
Memphis Giants players
Memphis Lambs players
Fort Wayne Farmers players
Fort Wayne Indians players
Columbus Senators players